Whisper House is the sixth studio album and second musical by American singer-songwriter Duncan Sheik. It was released on RCA Victor in 2009.

Details
The album, Sheik's first in the wake of success from composing music for the Tony Award-winning musical Spring Awakening, contains selections from an original stage musical of the same name, with book and additional lyrics by Kyle Jarrow. The world premiere of the musical occurred January 13, 2010, at San Diego, California's Old Globe Theatre. Directed by Peter Askin, the cast included Arthur Acuna, Holly Brook, Kevin Hoffman, Ted Koch, David Poe, Mare Winningham, and Eric Brent Zutty. Sheik cited influences from part of his childhood spent around Hilton Head, South Carolina, and recalling its iconic lighthouse and the ghost stories he shared there with friends.

Release
The album was met with little commercial success, but favorable reviews. Review aggregating website Metacritic reports a normalized score of 71% based on 4 reviews. The album's first single, "Earthbound Starlight", debuted via the "Pop Candy" blog on USAToday.com. On Sheik's official website, streaming audio was made available for the album's first single, as well as its first and second tracks, in advance of the album release.

Track listing

"Better to Be Dead"
"We're Here to Tell You"
"And Now We Sing" (feat. Holly Brook)
"The Tale of Solomon Snell"
"Earthbound Starlight"
"Play Your Part"
"You've Really Gone and Done It Now"
"How It Feels"
"I Don't Believe in You"
"Take A Bow"
"The Ghost In You" (iTunes bonus song)

References

2009 albums
Duncan Sheik albums
RCA Records albums